The British Sledge Hockey Association (BSHA) is the national governing body in the United Kingdom for ice sledge hockey. Formed in 1995, its main objectives are to expand the number of teams active in the UK (and by association the number or participants) and to develop the national team.

As of the 2015–16 season, there are five teams that compete in the BSHA League: Cardiff Huskies, Kingston Kestrels, Manchester Phoenix, Sheffield Steelkings and Peterborough Phantoms. A new team, the Endeavour Eagles is joining the league for the 2017 season, based out of Basingstoke.  This new team will consist primarily of military personnel, most of whom were injured or disabled in the line of duty.

Great Britain National Team 
The BSHA oversees the GB National Sledge Hockey Team.  The team currently competes in the International Paralympic Committee (IPC) Ice Sledge Hockey World Championships B Pool and hopes to qualify to attend the 2018 Winter Paralympics in South Korea.

The team roster as of 15 April 2019 is:

Netminders
Bryan Hackworth – Sheffield Steelkings

Forwards/Defence
Bryan Hackworth – Sheffield Steelkings
Dean Lahan – Manchester Mayhem
Jonathan LeGalloudec – Cardiff Huskies
Jamie Hutchcraft – Peterborough Phantoms
Mark Colquitt – Sheffield Steelkings
Matt Woollias – Sheffield Steelkings
Karl Nicholson – Manchester Mayhem
Tyler Christopher – Cardiff Huskies
Ashley Greening – Peterborough Phantoms
Scotty Trigg-Turner – Peterborough Phantoms
Marty Quinn – Peterborough Phantoms

Team Manager: Shirley Packwood

Head Coach: Ian Offers

References

External links
Official site

Sledge hockey
Ice hockey governing bodies in the United Kingdom
Sports organizations established in 1995